Fredrik Carl Wilhelm Kessiakoff (born 17 May 1980) is a Swedish former professional road bicycle racer. Kessiakoff turned to road racing in 2009, having had a successful career as a professional mountain biker for many years, winning the Swedish national championship 4 times, and finishing third at the 2006 World Mountain biking championships. He twice represented Sweden at the Olympics. Kessiakoff retired in 2014.

Career achievements

Major results

Mountain biking

2002
1st Swedish Championships U23
1st Overall Swedish Cup
2003
2nd Swedish Championships
2004
1st Swedish Championships
2005
1st World Cup Marathon, Falun, Sweden
1st Sunshine Cup, Cyprus
4th World Championships
2nd Absa Cape Epic (with Christoph Sauser)
2006
1st Swedish Championships
1st Nordic Championships
1st Overall Bundesliga, Germany
1st Int Italia, Nalles, Italy
3rd Team Relay European Championships
3rd World Championships
4th European Championships
2007
1st World Cup Final
1st Swedish Championships
3rd European Championships
4th World Championships
2008
1st Sunshine Race, Cyprus
1st Swedish Championships
5th World Championships
7th European Championships

Road racing

2009
4th Overall Tour de Langkawi
6th GP Lugano
6th Giro dell'Emilia
9th Overall Tour de Romandie
2011
1st Overall Tour of Austria
1st Stage 2
2012
1st Stage 11 (ITT) Vuelta a España
1st Stage 7 (ITT) Tour de Suisse
Tour de France
Held  King of the Mountains jersey from stage 8 to 10 and stage 12 to 16.
2nd Giro dell'Emilia
3rd Milano–Torino
5th UCI World Time Trial Championship
9th Overall Tour du Haut-Var
10th Giro di Lombardia

Grand Tour general classification results timeline

References

External links

Profile at Astana official website

1980 births
Living people
Swedish male cyclists
People from Nacka Municipality
Marathon mountain bikers
Cross-country mountain bikers
Tour de Suisse stage winners
Swedish Vuelta a España stage winners
Olympic cyclists of Sweden
Cyclists at the 2004 Summer Olympics
Cyclists at the 2008 Summer Olympics
Cape Epic cyclists
Sportspeople from Stockholm County